Two-cell Chinese Braille was designed in the 1970s and is used in parallel with traditional Chinese Braille in China.

Each syllable is rendered with two braille characters. The first combines the initial and medial; the second the rime and tone. The base letters represent the initial and rime; these are modified with diacritics for the medial and tone. Thus each of the braille cells has aspects of an abugida.

Braille charts

Onsets
The first cell indicates the initial, generally in dots 1 to 4, and the medial in dots 5 and 6. This design exploits restrictions on co-occurrence of initials and medials to fit all the allowable combinations in a single cell.

The medial -i- is represented by dot 5, the medial -u- by dot 6, and the medial -ü- by both dots 5 and 6. The z c s series is derived from zh ch sh as if they contained a -i- medial; these two series are not distinguished in many Mandarin dialects. As in traditional Chinese Braille, k g h and q j x are unified, as they never contrast.

A null/zero initial (a vowel-initial syllable) is indicated with the null consonant .

At least one letter in each place of articulation comes from international use ( f,  ti,  l,  k,  xi,  zh), with at least some of the others derived from these (cf.  k h g and  ch sh zh).

Rimes
The second cell represents the rime, generally in the top half of the cell, and the tone, generally in dots 3 and 6.

Tone 1 (mā) is indicated by dot 3, tone 2 (má) by dot 6, and tone 3 (mǎ) by dots 3 and 6. (In rime -ei, which already contains a dot 3, the dot 3 for tones 1 and 3 is replaced by dot 5 ( or ).) Tone 4 (mà) and neutral/toneless syllables use the basic rime.

  is the 'zero' rime transcribed as -i after z c s zh ch sh r in pinyin; here it's also used to carry the tone for syllables where the medial is the rime, such as gu or mi. After b p m f, it is equivalent to pinyin -u.
  is transcribed in pinyin as o after b p m f w and the medial u; otherwise it's e.

The rime er is written as if it were *ra; this is possible because *ra is not a possible syllable in Mandarin. At the end of a word,  -r is erhua, as in  huār (花儿). Within a word, hyphenate erhua to avoid confusion with an initial r- in the following syllable.

Combining onset and rime
Combinations of onset and rime follow the conventions of zhuyin, and are therefore not obvious from pinyin transcription. 
 for pinyin -in, use medial -i- with rime -en; for -ing, use -i- and -eng
 for -un (the equivalent of wen), use -u- and -en; for -ong (the equivalent of weng), use -u- and -eng
 for -iong (the equivalent of yueng, though written yong in pinyin), use -ü- and -eng

Several syllables are palindromes, with the onset and rime written the same: 
 ǎ,  bò,  mó,  tuǒ,  nuǎn,  liāo,  lǔ,  jìng,  qīng,  kǔn,  xiào,  hú,  zhòu,  zàng,  chōu,  cāng,  shàn,  sài

A toneless or 4th-tone zero rime is omitted at the end of a polysyllabic word. (Words ending in  rì 'day' are an exception, to prevent confusion with the erhua suffix.) When context makes it unambiguous, the zero rime in other tones may also be omitted.

Sandhi is not rendered; rather, the inherent tone of a morpheme is written.

The following are rendered as toneless syllables: 
Interjections and grammatical particles such as  a,  ya,  wa,  ba,  la,  ne,  ma.
The verbal aspectual suffixes  -le,  -zhe,  -guo
The nominal suffixes  -zi and  -tou.

Common abbreviations
Suffixes

  men
  de

  gè
  le

  shì

Words

  wǒ (  wǒmende)
  nǐ
  tā
  shì
  yǒu
  méi (  méiyǒu)
  néng
  zài (  zài)
  hé
  shí

  kě (  kěyǐ)
  jiù (  jiùshi)
  hái (  háishi)
  yào
  yě
  tóngzhì
  xiānshēng
  fūrén
  xiǎojiě

  Běijīng
  Dōngjīng
  Héng
  Hóng
  Hóng
  Hóng
  Huáng
  Jié
  Nánjīng
  Shànghǎi
  Wáng
  Wāng
  Xiānggǎng
  lái

Homophones
Some common homophones are distinguished by prefixing with a dot 4  or 5 , or by dropping the rime:

 tā:  (he) ,  (she) ,  (it) 
 zài:  (at) ,  (again) 
 shì:  (to be) ,  (thing) 

The three grammatical uses of non-tonic de are irregular:
 de: attributive  , adverbial  , complement   

Often printed Chinese can be contracted, compared to speech, as unambiguous where a phonetic rendition such as braille would be ambiguous; in such cases, the sign  may be used to indicate the omitted syllables. For example, in the clause  Lù cóng jīnyè bái,  lù means 'dew' (colloquial  lùshuǐ). However, there are several other words transcribed  lù in braille. To clarify, the  element of the colloquial word can be added with the  prefix:

Lù(shuǐ) cóng jīnyè bái

For example, in print the meaning of

Liǎng'àn yuán shēng tí 
(from both sides, the voices of monkeys cried out)

is clear, but in a phonetic script  yuán 'monkey' and  tí 'cry' can be obscure. The first can be clarified as  yuánhóu 'primate' and the second with the parenthetical  jiào 'call':

Liǎng'àn yuán(hóu) shēng tí (jiào)

When longer parenthetical explanations are provided, the sign  is repeated before each word (not each syllable).

Numbers
Numbers are the same as in other braille alphabets. Use the number sign  followed by  1,  2,  3,  4,  5,  6,  7,  8,  9,  0.

Formatting
{|class=wikitable
|-
|emphasis||
|-
|proper name||
|-
|foreign script||
|-
|number||
|}

 is also used for reduplication rather than repeating a syllable or word. When attached to a word, it repeats a syllable; standing alone, it repeats a word:

xǔxǔ-duōduō

Xiàngqián, xiàngqián, xiàngqián!

Punctuation
Chinese braille punctuation is based on that of French Braille, but they are generally split between two cells. This gives them the 'full-width' feel of print Chinese, as well as avoiding confusion with letters.
{|class=wikitable
|-
| clausal comma || 
|-
| phrasal comma || 
|-
| full stop / period || 
|-
| question mark || 
|-
| exclamation mark || 
|-
| wave dash  || 
|-
| interpunct  || 
|-
| colon || 
|-
| semicolon || 
|-
| ellipsis  || 
|}

{|class=wikitable
|-
! !!Outer!!Inner
|-
|quotation marks  || ...  ||  ... 
|-
|title quotes  || ...  ||  ... 
|-
|parentheses  || ...  ||  ... 
|}

{|class=wikitable
|-
|square brackets  ||  ... 
|-
|dashes   ||  ... 
|}

References

Innovative braille scripts
Transcription of Chinese